Hunshyal (P.G.)  is a village in the southern state of Karnataka, India. It is located in the Gokak taluk of Belagavi district in It has mallakamba or halokali in Shri veeranjaneya jatre .it comes in January or February  month .ln every year 1st,2nd,3rd of January arranged a big jatra . this jatra belongs to Shri siddhalingeshwar &shambhavi Mata.

In this jatra arrangesThe satsang sammelana 

ಇಲ್ಲಿ ಒಂದು ಶಾಸನ ದೊರೆತಿದ್ದು ಅದರ ಬಗ್ಗೆ ಯಾರೂ ಗಮನ ಹರಿಸಿಲ್ಲ. ಅದು ಅರೇಬಿಕ್ ಭಾಷೆ ಹೋಲುತ್ತದೆ. 

ಊರ ಚಾವಡಿಯ ಪಕ್ಕದಲ್ಲಿದೆ.ಅದಕ್ಕೆ ಜನರೆಲ್ಲ ದೇವರೆಂದು ಹಾಲು ಹಾಕುತ್ತಾರೆ.

Demographics
 India census, Hunshyal (P.G.) had a population of 5896 with 2964 males and 2932 females.

See also
 Belgaum
 Districts of Karnataka

References

External links
 http://Belgaum.nic.in/

Villages in Belagavi district